Deathbird (Cal'syee Neramani-Summers) is a fictional character appearing in American comic books published by Marvel Comics. Created by Chris Claremont, John Byrne, and Dave Cockrum, she is usually depicted as a supervillain, an adversary of the X-Men.

Deathbird is part of a segment of the extraterrestrial Shi'ar race that possesses talon-tipped wings. She is the hated sister of the Shi'ar empress Lilandra Neramani, the mother of the Shi'ar warrior, Deathcry, and constantly seeks to usurp her sister's throne. She is also a sister of D'Ken, the first depicted ruler of the Shi'ar.

Publication history
Created by writer Chris Claremont and artists John Byrne and Dave Cockrum, she first appeared in Ms. Marvel #9.

Fictional character biography

Deathbird was born Cal'syee Neramani to the ruling house of the Shi'ar Imperium on the Aerie (now known as Chandilar), native world of the Shi'ar. Her name was stripped from her after it was prophesied that she was destined to commit great evil. She was exiled after brutally murdering both her mother and an unnamed sister.

During this exile, she traveled on Earth and became an associate of MODOK and A.I.M. at some point. Following AIM's orders, she battled Ms. Marvel in New York one evening after Carol Danver's Park Avenue penthouse was destroyed by a bomb. The skirmish was interrupted after Deathbird severely injured the superhero, who became distracted trying to save the lives of two small children. It later resumed when Carol, going undercover, discovered that AIM had a secret headquarters underneath Alden's Department Store. The battle between the two seemingly ended with Deathbird's demise and MODOK's escape after betraying her. Whether Deathbird sought revenge on AIM remains unknown. She did battle Hawkeye while still on Earth. She battles Ms. Marvel again.

Some time later, her younger sister Lilandra became Majestrix of the Empire following the events that left their brother, D'Ken, comatose. Deathbird decided to take the throne for herself, and allied with the councilman Samedar, alien parasites called the Brood, and renegade members of the Imperial Guard in an attempted coup. The X-Men defeated her and her allies, but not before being infected by the Brood (although they were ultimately cured thanks to the efforts of Danvers and the Acanti Soulsinger). She later succeeded in deposing Lilandra with the aid of the Brood, and took the throne for herself. As ruler of the Shi'ar Empire, she contended with the Starjammers and Excalibur, and sought to capture Rachel Summers, but was nearly killed by Lilandra in combat.

Some time later War Skrulls impersonating Charles Xavier and the Starjammers aided Lilandra in deposing Deathbird and restoring her to the throne. With Lila Cheney's help, she and the X-Men defeated the War Skrulls, but Deathbird ceded the empire back to Lilandra, since she had grown bored of the bureaucracy.

Deathbird later came to her sister's aid during the short Kree-Shi'ar War, assassinating Kree leaders Ael-Dann and Dar-Benn. She was captured by Clint Barton in his guise as Goliath. She was later released and granted dominion over the conquered Kree Empire as viceroy, and also made praetor (leader) of the Kree Starforce by Lilandra. She led the Starforce in a confrontation with Quasar. The Kree seem to have since become independent once more.

Romance with Bishop
When the Shi'ar asked for the X-Men's help against the invading Phalanx, who had already reached their throne-world Chandilar, the X-Men allied themselves with Deathbird. They managed to fend off a Phalanx assault on the Shi'ar Empire, and during the conflict, Deathbird and the X-Man Bishop forged a warrior's respect for each other. Deathbird was amazed that the Earth mutant showed no fear and stood up to her, and they also seemed physically attracted to each other.

As a gesture of honor, Deathbird escorted the mutants back to Earth, but their ship was inexplicably destroyed in transit. Deathbird and an injured Bishop escaped using a private ship. She initially convinced Bishop that he was paralyzed due to his injuries and that, of all the X-Men, only he survived. However, not before long, Bishop realized that he was not injured but that Deathbird was using the lab equipment to hold him in stasis. The craft was soon attacked, and Bishop convinced her to release him so that they could deal with the matter together. Eventually, they bonded and soon became romantically involved.

During their journeys, the two were accidentally transported to an alternate future Earth that was ruled by the evil daughter of Shi'ar Empress Lilandra and Charles Xavier. Bishop and Deathbird helped the rebels in opposing her and Deathbird defeated her niece in a duel. She could have slain her, and every instinct told her to do so, but she let her live. The heroes of the liberated Earth helped Bishop and Deathbird return to their own time, and they continued their quest to get home.

Betrayal and theorized heritage

Eventually, Bishop and Deathbird return to the Sol System and encountered the inert planetary mass of the Living Monolith on their way to Terra Firma. Curious, the two land their craft and investigate the man-shaped planet. Suddenly Deathbird betrayed Bishop to a cadre of Skrulls and he was returned to Earth in order to implement the ultimate plans of the Skrulls' ally, Apocalypse. Deathbird was herself betrayed and transformed by Apocalypse into one of his Horsemen. With the title of War, Deathbird helped Apocalypse assemble the X-Men he referred to as "the Twelve." Apocalypse was defeated, however, and Deathbird and the Horsemen scattered.

Deathbird and Bishop later run into each other during the Maximum Security event. Earth had been made a prison planet, with an energy barrier around the solar system, and Deathbird had the key to unlocking it. Bishop confronts her, and the two fight. Deathbird dares Bishop to kill her, before opening an airlock and getting sucked out into space. Bishop was able to close the airlock, and admits to himself that he hates her.

Some time later a globetrotting X-Men team led by Storm exile themselves from their home and teammates in order to find Destiny's thirteen diaries since none like the idea of having their destinies defined. This team would recruits new members Heather Cameron and her brother Davis. During a mission to infiltrate the ship of the intergalactic warlord Khan, Heather's appearance changes to resemble the alien Shi'ar race, and it was theorized that she and Davis had some Shi'ar heritage, Jean Grey noting that the cranial markings on her head and the crest of feathers she had manifested indicated Heather is of Shi'ar royal ancestry. An entry from Destiny's diary seems to imply that at least Heather was "Mothered by War," which happened to be Deathbird's Horseman moniker while she was serving Apocalypse. The entry shows a picture of Deathbird facing off some of the X-Treme team members (Storm, Bishop, Thunderbird and Lifeguard in her Shi'ar appearance).

The Rise and Fall of the Shi'ar Empire
Deathbird was rescued by the Imperial Guard; Lilandra imprisoned her because she posed a threat to her rule.

Vulcan is captured by the palace guard as he enters Shi'ar territory on his quest for vengeance against the entire Shi'ar race. He is incarcerated in the same maximum security installation that houses Deathbird. Vulcan is released by a member of a secret order that wishes D'Ken to lead the Shi'ar once more; Vulcan releases Deathbird.

Vulcan is enthralled by Deathbird, and they become romantically involved. He promises to put his quest for vengeance on hold.  Deathbird convinces Vulcan to finish the healing process that the Shi'ar members of the secret order had begun on D'Ken, who remained in a coma since the M'Kraan Crystal incident. When D'Ken discerns Vulcan's feelings for Deathbird, he invokes an ancient Shi'ar custom and invites Vulcan to marry Deathbird and become part of Shi'ar royalty.

Vulcan and Deathbird are married in front of the M'Kraan Crystal just as the X-Men, Lilandra, The Starjammers, and the Shi'ar loyal to Lilandra attack. During the chaos that ensues Vulcan kills D'Ken (never having promised not to kill him) and assumes the throne of Emperor of the Shi'ar Empire, with Deathbird as his Empress. During the fight Polaris crushes the ribs of Deathbird's husband and she instructs the Imperial Guard, still loyal to the ruling family, to protect them as they flee.

The Providian Order
At some point after Vulcan's death she was captured by a top secret organization, however they were not interested in Deathbird, but in her child - a hybrid of an atavistic Shi'ar and a Human Mutant. The Providian Order, as the organization calls itself, was created to bring equality and uniformity to the universe, by creating a new perfect race. Sharada Darthri, the geneticist of the Providian Order, experimented on the baby and infused it with Kree geneline, thought the influx was stopped by the awakening of Deathbird, who rampaged through the laboratory.

Powers and abilities
Deathbird is a genetic mutant of the Shi'ar species; she has superhuman strength, speed, stamina, agility, flexibility, reflexes, coordination, balance, and endurance well beyond the average limits of her race. She shares the same avian-like physiology typical of her race, such as having hollow bones, but in her case the avian characteristics are more pronounced. This is because she is a "genetic throwback", meaning that she resembles the more primitive Shi'ar who were birds of prey. She has inherited atavistic characteristics such as fully functioning wings, which most Shi'ar lack, and is capable of self-propelled flight at a natural winged flight limit velocity. Her wings are also very strong, as she could flex her wing to throw Ms. Marvel off the building or to the wall.

Deathbird's fingernails are essentially talons which can score steel and tear through substances such as bone and tissue easily.

Aside from her natural physical advantages, Deathbird is a formidably trained warrior of great skill and cunning, having trained the likes of Gladiator. She is also skilled at hurling javelins. She uses a variety of javelins, some of which are designed for specific offensive effects. She carries the javelins as eight-inch (203 mm) quills on twin wrist-bands; when removed from its sheath, a quill will telescope to about four times its original length. Her standard javelin can be used as a spear-like projectile to wound or kill her foes. She has also used a javelin that emits noxious, acrid fumes upon impact. Some of Deathbird's javelins are so designed that when their tips touch they emit a powerful, repeating 35,000 volt electrical charge.

Deathbird has also used other equipment of Shi'ar design, including battle armor, and a large, advanced, one-woman energy cannon.

Reception

Accolades 

 In 2018, CBR.com ranked Deathbird 23rd in their "Age Of Apocalypse: The 30 Strongest Characters In Marvel's Coolest Alternate World" list.
 In 2019, Screen Rant included Deathbird in their "X-Men: The 10 Most Powerful Members Of The Xavier Family" list.
 In 2019, CBR.com ranked Deathbird 6th in their "Captain Marvel: 10 Iconic Villains" list, 8th in their "10 Most Powerful Shi'ar" list, and 9th in their "X-Men: The 10 Most Powerful Female Villains" list.
 In 2021, Screen Rant included Deathbird in their "X-Men: 10 Best Female Villains" list.
 In 2022, Screen Rant included Deathbird in their "Captain Marvel: Main Comic Book Villains Ranked Lamest To Coolest" list.

Other versions

Age of Apocalypse
In the Age of Apocalypse, Deathbird appears as the leader of the Starjammers. It is also revealed that she took over the Shi'ar throne when she and D'ken murdered their father, but Deathbird was later betrayed by D'ken who forcibly took the throne for himself before murdering Lilandra. With nowhere else to go Deathbird joined the Starjammers to oppose D'ken's rule. They ended up rescuing Gambit and his team, who had journeyed to the Shi'ar homeworld in the hopes of stealing the powerful M'Kraan Crystal. The crystal had become increasingly unstable of late and it was emitting waves of energy that crystallized anything that got in their way. Deathbird teamed up with the mutants in the hope they could help wrestle control of the crystal from D'ken. When they made their way to the crystal Deathbird and a few of the mutants were pulled inside it and discovered another dimension residing within. Deathbird discovered D'ken inside the crystal, trapped by its energies, and when she attempted to kill him she too became trapped.

Star Trek: X-Men
Deathbird defies the will of her sister and leads a Shi'ar force into the Star Trek reality. There, she attempts to partner with the reality-controlling Gary Mitchell.

X-Men: The End
In X-Men: The End, written by Chris Claremont, an alternate future of the X-Men's last days, it is revealed that there is a mutant named Aliyah who is the daughter of Lucas Bishop and Deathbird.  In the end, she is killed by her daughter, after having been infected with a Brood Queen egg.

In other media

Television
Deathbird made several appearances in the original 1990s X-Men animated series. In flashbacks, she was seen at D'Ken's side when Christopher and Katherine Summers were abducted. Following Lilandra's ascension to the throne of the empire, Deathbird sought to overthrow her sister and install herself as Majestrix, for which she joined Apocalypse, and was at his side when Fabian Cortez was captured. However, Apocalypse was merely using Deathbird for his own plans. During the episodes Beyond Good and Evil, she attacked Lilandra alongside Apocalypse, yet was abandoned at the mercy of Lilandra and Imperial Guard Praetor Gladiator. Apocalypse simply wanted a distraction so he could kidnap Oracle, the psychic of the Imperial Guard.

Video games
Deathbird also appeared in the first X-Men video game for the Sega Genesis, where she had kidnapped her sister Lilandra.

Deathbird appeared again as a boss in the Sega Genesis game's sequel, X-Men 2: Clone Wars.

Deathbird appeared as a boss in the video game Marvel: Ultimate Alliance, voiced by Nika Futterman. She has staged a coup d'état of her sister's throne just as the heroes visit the Shi'ar Empire to borrow a piece of the M'Kraan Crystal in order to defeat Doctor Doom after he has absorbed Odin's powers. Having defeated her in combat, the heroes then have to prevent Deathbird from destroying the ship to ensure that they cannot escape (finding and, if the player opts for such, freeing the imprisoned Lilandra in the process). Deathbird has special dialogue with Black Panther before the fight, Iron Man after the fight, Wolverine at the science room, and Sabretooth (in the Xbox 360 Expansion Pack) where she mistakes the latter for the former, much to Sabretooth's anger.

References

External links
 
 Deathbird at Marvel Directory
 

Characters created by Chris Claremont
Characters created by Dave Cockrum
Comics characters introduced in 1977
Fictional emperors and empresses
Marvel Comics characters who can move at superhuman speeds
Marvel Comics characters with superhuman strength
Marvel Comics extraterrestrial supervillains
Marvel Comics female supervillains
Marvel Comics martial artists
Marvel Comics mutants
Shi'ar